The Orthocerataceae is a superfamily of orthocerid cephalopods that lived from the late Early Ordovician to the Early Cretaceous, but is no longer in general use.

The Orthocerataceae is one of two superfamilies in the Orthocerida presented in the Treatise, the other being the Pseudorthocerataceae. With the recognition of orthocerids and pseuorthocerids as separate orders, the two superfamilies became unnecessary taxa with the Orthoceraceacea and Pseudorthocerataceae left as historical references.

As originally conceived the Orthocerataceae unites families characterized by straight or slightly curved, smooth or ornamented shells, generally with a circular cross section and tubular, centrally positioned siphuncles;  given an overall range from the Lower Ordovician to the Upper Triassic.  Eleven families were included, among which are the Orthoceratidae, Troedssonellidae, Dawsonoceratidae, and Paraphragmitidae. With the discovery of Zhuralevia from the Lower Cretaceous of the Caucasus by Doguzhaeva (pub 1994) the range of this group was effectively  well advanced to at least late Aptian.

References

 Flower, R. H. 1976. Ordovician Cephalopod Faunas and Their Role in Correlation; The Ordovician System; Paleontological Association symposium 1974
 Kroger, B. 2008. A new genus of middle Tremadocian orthoceratoids and the Early Ordovician origin of orthoceratoid cephalopods  Acta Palaeontologica Polonica 53 (4): 745–749, 2008

Orthocerida
Prehistoric animal superfamilies
Ordovician first appearances
Cretaceous extinctions